The FC Istiklol 2015 season is Istiklol's seventh Tajik League season. They are the current defending Champions in the Tajik League, Tajik Cup and Tajik Supercup having completed a Domestic Treble during the 2014 season. They will also participate in the AFC Cup for the first time, entering at the group stage.

Squad

Out on loan

Transfers

Winter

In:

Out:

Summer

In:

Out:

Friendlies

TFF Cup

Preliminary round

Group stage

Knockout-stage

Competitions

Tajik Supercup

Tajik League

Results summary

Results by round

Results

League table

Tajik Cup

Final

AFC Cup

Group stage

Knock-out stage

Final

Squad statistics

Appearances and goals

|-
|colspan="14"|Players away from Istiklol on loan:

|-
|colspan="14"|Players who left Istiklol during the season:
|}

Goal scorers

Disciplinary record

See also
List of unbeaten football club seasons

Notes

References

External links 
 FC Istiklol Official Web Site

FC Istiklol seasons
Istiklol